Jhonny MacKay (born 20 January 1954) is an Ecuadorian judoka. He competed in the men's half-middleweight event at the 1976 Summer Olympics.

References

External links
 

1954 births
Living people
Ecuadorian male judoka
Olympic judoka of Ecuador
Judoka at the 1976 Summer Olympics
Place of birth missing (living people)